
Gmina Drawno is an urban-rural gmina (administrative district) in Choszczno County, West Pomeranian Voivodeship, in north-western Poland.

Villages
Apart from the town of Drawno, Gmina Drawno contains the villages and settlements of Barników, Barnimie, Bogdanka, Borki, Borowiec, Brac, Brodźce, Brzeziny, Chomętowo, Dobrojewo, Dolina, Dominikowo, Drawnik, Gack, Gładysz, Janków, Jaźwiny, Karpin, Karpinek, Kawczyn, Kępa, Kiełpino, Kolonia Kniewo, Konotop, Kośnik, Kostrzewa, Maciejów, Międzybór, Niemieńsko, Niemieńsko-Zamek, Nowa Korytnica, Ostrożyce, Podegrodzie, Podlesie, Prostynia, Przysiekiercze, Pszczewko, Rogoźnica, Rościn, Samborz, Sicienko, Sieniawa, Skrzaty, Śmieszkowo, Święciechów, Wiśniewo, Zacisze, Zalesie, Zatom, Zdanów, Żółwinko and Żółwino.

Neighbouring gminas
Gmina Drawno is bordered by the gminas of Bierzwnik, Choszczno, Człopa, Dobiegniew, Kalisz Pomorski, Recz and Tuczno.

References
Polish official population figures 2006

Drawno
Choszczno County